Extinction is a neurological disorder that impairs the ability to perceive multiple stimuli of the same type simultaneously. Extinction is usually caused by damage resulting in lesions on one side of the brain. Those who are affected by extinction have a lack of awareness in the contralesional side of space (towards the left side space following a right lesion) and a loss of exploratory search and other actions normally directed toward that side.

Effect of the laterality of the sensory inputs 

Unilateral lesions of various brain structures can cause a failure to sense contralesional stimuli in the absence of obvious sensory losses. This failure is defined as unilateral extinction if it occurs solely in the case of simultaneous bilateral sensory stimulations. Unilateral extinction can occur with bilateral visual, auditory and tactile stimuli, as well as with bilateral cross-modal stimulations of these sensory systems, and is more frequent following right hemisphere brain damage (RHD) than left hemisphere brain damage (LHD). Unilateral sensory extinction is thought by most to be explained by competition models of selective attention where each stimulus competes to gain access to limited pools of attentional resources. Because of a special role of the right hemisphere in attention, lesions of that hemisphere would disadvantage sensory inputs from the contralateral left hemispace relative from those from the right space.

The idea that inputs from the contralesional side of space may undergo a faulty processing regardless of whether they are primarily directed to the damaged or intact hemisphere has been provided on the most part by studies on olfactory neglect and extinction. The laterality of the sensory inputs makes a difference insofar as left-sided inputs directed to the intact left hemisphere are not affected by extinction, or affected to a much smaller degree than left-sided inputs directed to the damaged right hemisphere. In other words, the lateral organization of sensory inputs should be reconsidered as a far from negligible factor in the cross-modal pattern of unilateral sensory extinction from unilateral brain damage.

Theories of unilateral extinction 
Two of the major theories of unilateral extinction are the sensory theory and the representational theory. The sensory theory involves an attenuation of sensory input to the right hemisphere from the contralateral side of the body and space. The representational theory involves a disordered internal representation of the contralateral side of the body and space, not dependent on sensory input. Recent literature suggests that unilateral extinction patients not only fail to respond to the contralateral external space, but also to internally represented stimuli with patients frequently locating the details of the left side on the right side.

Research and characteristics of extinction 
German neurologists documented clinical descriptions of extinction a century ago, but the syndrome subsequently received less systematic attention than other classical neurological syndromes in part due to the rareness of suitable theoretical ideas. Moreover, despite the dramatic loss of awareness for one side, extinction was rarely considered in discussions of the neural basis of conscious perceptual experience until recently. In extinction there is a spatially specific loss of awareness. This has been difficult to explain because so many neural pathways conventionally associated with conscious perception (including primary sensory areas) remain intact in many patients. There is also much excitement about the possibility of relating awareness to neural substrates in extinction studies. In addition to revealing the critical lesion sites associated with the various clinical manifestations of visual neglect, a key message of the current investigation is that there is a need to develop more sensitive and nuanced assessment tools to characterize the different facets of this heterogeneous syndrome. It will be important to bring laboratory tests into the clinic in an effort to identify specific cognitive functions by examining each in isolation thus combining more specific descriptions extinction with better clinical measures that isolate specific cognitive functions to yield more consistent lesion mapping results in the future.

Grouping effect in extinction 

Neglect and extinction often present simultaneously in patients. When looking at neglect, studies have demonstrated that there is more to the spatial nature than mere primary sensory loss. Proposals of this kind have become increasingly frequent in recent years but attentional accounts for neglect are not universally popular. We can think of one primary component of neglect as involving inattention and that extinction is by no means the whole story for neglect. Extinction encapsulates a critical general principle that applies for most aspects of neglect, namely that the patient's spatial deficit is most apparent in competitive situations, where information towards the good ipsilesional side comes to dominate information that would otherwise be acknowledged towards the contralesional side. This may relate to the attentional limitation seen in neurologically healthy people. We cannot become aware of multiple targets all at once, even if our sensory systems have transduced them. This is seen in patients with extinction, who are able to detect a single target in any location, with a deficit only for multiple concurrent targets. Therefore, extinction can be regarded as a pathological, spatially specific exaggeration of the normal difficulty in distributing attention to multiple targets so we can predict that it should be reduced if the two competing events could be grouped together. Several recent findings from right-parietal patients with left extinction confirm this prediction, suggesting that grouping mechanisms may still operate despite the pathological spatial bias of the patient to influence whether a particular stimulus will reach the patient's awareness. Thus extinction is reduced when the concurrent target events can be linked into a single subjective object, becoming allies rather than competitors in the bid to attract attention. Furthermore, the extent of residual processing extinct stimuli can vary from one patient to another, depending on the exact extent of their lesion. The examples of residual unconscious processing so far all concern the visual modality although evidence is starting to emerge concerning similar effects for extinguished tactile and auditory stimuli.

Physiology/characteristics 
Extinction as well as spatial neglect are deficits caused by large lesions in the vasculatory territory of the medial cerebral artery [20]. Some studies say that extinction occurs after damage to the right or left hemisphere. Patients with extinction do not report stimuli located in space contralateral to their damaged hemisphere when the stimuli are presented simultaneously with ipsilesional stimuli. Extinction to double simultaneous stimulation is not only attributed to a primary sensory deficit since these patients are aware of contralateral stimuli presented individually. Attentional Deficit Hyperactivity Disorder (ADHD) is more focused on as a role of abnormal sensory processing of contralesional input. The patients have a pathologically limited attentional capacity and an attentional bias towards ipsilesional space, they are more likely to attend to and become aware of ipsilesional stimuli at the expense of contralesional ones. It is noteworthy that the right Temporoparietal Junction (TPJ) has been linked to a number of cognitive functions that suggest a role in modulating competitive interactions between stimulus representations, which would converge with the importance of this area for the attentional deficit displayed by extinction patients.

The critical lesion site responsible for the syndrome has been debated for more than a decade. Different criterion was used to identify extinction in their patient samples, which lead to inconsistencies in the critical lesion sites reported across studies. Recent studies have used measures such as ERPs and fMRI and it is believed that the parietal lobe mediates the internal representation of both body and space. They found that in their sample, a cortical lesion was almost always found in the right parietal angula gyrus region. Patients typically showed damage to the inferior parietal areas of the brain. There can also be preserved function in the superior parietal lobe, even with inferior parietal damage. Parietal regions include some neurons with ipsilateral receptive fields, so that while the representation within one hemisphere emphasizes contralateral space overall, some ipsilateral representation is present also. More specifically, the number of left-hemisphere neurons with visual receptive fields at a particular location decreases monotonically as one considers increasingly peripheral locations in the left visual field, and vice versa in the right hemisphere. This might go some way towards explaining why extinction is more severe after right-hemisphere lesions in people, leaving the patient with just the steep gradient of the intact left hemisphere.

Types

Tactile 
Patients with tactile extinction are aware of being touched on a contralesional limb, but seem unaware of similar contralesional touch if touched simultaneously on their ipsilesional limb. In the tactile, extinction occurs in the domains of at the level of the hands, the face-neck, the arms-legs, both in case of symmetrical and asymmetrical stimulations, or between the two sides of a single body-part. Extinguished tactile stimulus does not access consciousness but it may interfere with perception of the ipsilesional one. Considerable processing can still take place prior to the level at which loss of awareness arises. The extinction can also rise in bilateral conditions. In a patient study, bilateral trials with extinction still revealed residual early components over the right hemisphere in response to the extinguished left touches. When somatosensory neural activity in the right hemisphere was reduced in amplitude when compared to the one by right hand stimulation on the left hemisphere. So it can be concluded that tactile extinction is defined in conditions of bilateral stimulation and perhaps unilateral stimulation as well. Extinction arises at a high level of tactile input processing.

Visual extinction 

Visual/spatial extinction, also known as pseudohemianopia, is the inability to perceive two simultaneous stimuli in each visual field. Those who show spatial extinction can detect a single item in both the left and right visual fields but, under certain conditions of bilateral double simultaneous stimulation (DSS), fails to detect the item in one field. It is thus believed that extinction is caused by sensory neglect, and that extinction reflects an attentional deficit rather than a contralesional deficit in primary perceptual processing. In visual extinction this attentional deficit in perception applies mainly to attention in the relevant dimension. Visual extinction is greatest when objects either have the same color or the same shape.

Studies suggest that brain damage to the parietal lobe causes sensory neglect and that in turn causes extinction. Spatial neglect specifically leads to visual extinction. Neglect often follows right inferior parietal damage, and is characterized by impaired attention and lack of awareness for stimuli on the contralesional (left) side of space. Any kind of brain damage can lead to neglect, things like stroke, brain tissue death, or tumors, and cause the unilateral damage to one side of the parietal lobe. Overall a person with parietal brain damage still has intact visual fields.

One way to reduce the effects of extinction is to use grouping of items. Brightness and edge based grouping reduces visual extinction and they act in an additive way. Grouping with similar shapes also reduces the effects of extinction. This suggests that the attentional deficit in extinction can be compensated, at least in part, by the brain's object recognition systems.

While the parietal lobe deals with sensation and perception, the amygdala controls the perception of fear and emotion. This means that by utilizing the perception abilities of the amygdala that emotional properties of contralesional stimuli can be extracted despite pathological inattention and unawareness. This is because the ability of the amygdala to perceive fear is autonomous and without conscious effort and attention. Unfortunately studies have shown that perception of fear can become habituated so it can be unreliable to reduce extinction by use of the amygdala.

Auditory extinction 
Auditory extinction is the failure to hear simultaneous stimuli on the left and right sides. This extinction is also caused by brain damage on one side of the brain where awareness is lost on the contralesional side. Affected people report the presence of side specific phonemes, albeit extinguishing them at the same time. This points to the fact that auditory extinction, like other forms of extinction, is more about acknowledging a stimulus in the contralesional side than about the actual sensing of the stimulus.

Just like other forms of extinction, auditory extinction is caused by brain damage resulting in lesions to one side of the parietal lobe. Auditory extinction appears to be a rather common phenomenon in the acute state of a vascular disease. The acute state of the vascular disease usually leads to neglect which then in turn leads to the auditory extinction. The number of lesions causes an additive effect when occurring in combination with a recent damage.

When it comes to treating and recognizing the occurrence of auditory extinction most sound can still be perceived with the other ear. The nature of sound, which possess directionality but still fills space, makes it more amenable to misattribution of source location. This is called the ‘prior entry’ effect. This is when a stimulus occurring at an attended location receives privileged access to awareness relative to one occurring at an unattended location.

Chemical extinction 
Little is known on the side of occurrence of unilateral extinction or neglect for sensory modalities, which are traditionally thought to project to the brain in a predominantly uncrossed fashion, such as olfaction and taste. To date, only a limited number of investigations concerning the suppression of (or competition among) spatial information processed through the so-called chemical senses have been reported. A number of various different reasons may account for this lack of research. First, the distinction between pure chemical versus somatosensory information is often problematic. Second, it is widely assumed that olfaction and taste are senses that are not specialized for conveying spatial information.

Olfactory extinction 

Multiple case studies and investigations have been conducted on unilateral neglect within the visual, auditory, and tactile sensory modalities, but only three case studies have been reported on neglect within the olfactory sensory modality. It is still unclear whether humans can localize at all the source of the olfactory stimulation by distinguishing between odors that are processed through the right versus the left nostril. This is particularly true when the stimulus is a pure odorant rather than trigeminal, that is when the odor does not cause any somatosensory stimulation that is known to be encoded by the trigeminal system. It was discovered that when pure odorants such as hydrogen sulfide or vanillin were used as stimulants localization was random. On the other hand, stimulation with carbon dioxide or menthol yielded identification rates of more than 96%. These results established the fact that directional orientation, considering single momentary odorous sensations, can only be assumed, when the olfactory stimulants simultaneously excite the trigeminal somatosensory system. Thus it is possible to distinguish between right and left side when the substances additionally or mainly excited the trigeminal nerve.

RHD patients with left tactile and visual neglect were reported to exhibit neglect and extinction of olfactory stimuli to the left nostril, in spite of the anatomically constrained projection of the olfactory input from that nostril to the intact left hemisphere. This finding was taken to suggest an impaired processing of all inputs from the contralesional side of space, regardless of whether such inputs were primarily directed to the damaged right hemisphere or the intact left hemisphere. Yet this interpretation is questionable because normal subjects appear unable to localize to a nostril a lateralized olfactory stimulus without the aid of an associated stimulation of the crossed trigeminal input from that same nostril. Further, and in keeping with the above notion, on a number of unilateral and bilateral olfactory stimulations those patients identified the left nostril input correctly, but misplaced it to the right nostril, possibly because of a rightward response bias related to left-sided neglect. Specifically, when two different stimuli were delivered to each nostril, RHD patients consistently failed to report the stimulus delivered to the left nostril. The olfactory system predominantly projects its fibers ipsilaterally thus these results are evidence supporting the representational theory of neglect. Also patients affected by olfactory extinction showed a large number of displacements in that the correctly identified stimuli presented to the left nostril were described as being in the right nostril.

Nevertheless, it is not completely possible to determine the exact influence exerted by the nasal somatosensation in the olfactory extinction reported, since one of the odours considered as being pure odorants was later found to be processed probably also by the trigeminal. It appears that the human olfactory system is able to localize the source of the olfactory stimulation only when the odour elicits also a trigeminal response. This contradicts the idea that trained participants can localize both trigeminal stimuli and pure odorants between the two nostrils. Moreover, recently it was shown that naive participants were able to reliably localize pure odorants between the two nostrils. Clearly, if the ability of the olfactory system to extract spatial information from non-trigeminal stimuli turns out to be true, new light could be shed on the extinction phenomena described for odors.

The olfactory sense also provides a unique mechanism to test the sensory and representational theories of unilateral neglect. Olfactory information projects predominantly to the ipsilateral hemisphere. Patients with a right hemisphere lesion show left sided neglect in other modalities and fail to respond to the left contralateral nostril, thus the representational theory is supported. It was suggested that since the olfactory sensory pathways to the cerebral hemispheres were not crossed, a neglect should have occurred on the right side if a sensory loss were the cause of neglect. Neglect in olfactory sense is compared with its occurrence in the trigeminal sense, a sense stimulated in the same manner as olfaction (chemically through the nasal passages)  but contralaterally innervated. Studies supporting the representational theory of unilateral neglect show that right hemisphere lesion patients with left unilateral neglect failed to respond to their left contralateral nostril on olfactory double simultaneous stimulation in spite of adequate olfactory sensitivity. This demonstrated that the occurrence of unilateral neglect is not a function of sensory attenuation, in fact, olfactory sensitivity did not correlate with number of extinctions.

Extinction of taste 

The existence of neglect and/or extinction in taste is less explored than olfaction, even though in humans the ability to localize taste stimuli presented on the tongue has been previously described. In the case of a patient with a wide parietal-occipital tumor, tactile extinction on the upper limbs and extinction of taste sensations on the left part of the tongue were seen when two tastes were presented simultaneously on each hemitongue. The results of the assessment revealed there is unimodal taste extinction and displacement of taste sensations under crossmodal taste-tactile stimulation. In particular, when a touch was delivered to the right hemi-tongue and a taste was applied on the left hemi-tongue, the patient repeatedly reported bilateral taste stimulation, thus surprisingly extinguishing the right touch and partially misplacing the left taste stimulus. Gustatory extinction also seems to occur consequently to a severe tactile extinction.

In the gustatory test done on patients with right brain damage (RHD) or left brain damage (LHD) and healthy subjects, nine RHD patients with left hemitongue tactile extinction showed no gustatory extinction for both unilateral and bilateral stimulations. Contrary to a largely crossed cortical representation of the limbs and other exteroceptive body sites, the tongue has been traditionally thought to enjoy a bilateral representation in the cortex for both somatic and gustatory modalities. In fact the tongue representation is bilateral in both modalities, but predominantly ipsilateral in the gustatory modality and predominantly contralateral in the tactile modality. The absence of left gustatory extinction in those patients can be attributed to the predominant channeling of left hemitongue taste inputs into the intact left hemisphere. Since there were no severe disturbances manifested in any of the present RHD or LHD patients, it seems reasonable to assume that gustatory extinction surfaces only as an accompaniment and possibly a consequence of a very marked extinction of tactile lingual sensitivity, or even a full blown intraoral tactile hemineglect. There is still no clear evidence of the existence of purely taste extinction and/or neglect.

More evidence that suggests the relationship between tactile and taste extinction in the tongue comes from a patient with a right parieto-occipital glioblastoma, tested with local applications of the four basic tastants (bitter, salty, sour, sweet), or with touch and pin prick stimuli to the two sides of the tongue. The patient missed most of the left hemitongue stimuli on bilateral stimulation, or less frequently wrongly attributed to them the quality of the concurrent right stimulus. Combinations of taste and mechanical stimuli showed an interference of left side stimuli on the perception of right stimuli, suggesting a complex alteration of the central tactile and gustatory representations of both sides of the tongue. Given that taste perception is usually co-mingled with tactile sensations, it is possible that left-sided gustatory extinction in severe left buccal hemineglect was secondary to left-sided lingual tactile extinction.

Multisensory 
Neglect and extinction can overlap for a single sensory modality, and even for multiple sensory modalities. Extinction affecting a unimodal sensory system can be influenced by the concurrent activation of another modality. Tactile extinction, as an example, can be modulated by visual events simultaneously presented in the region near the tactile stimulation, increasing or reducing tactile perception, depending upon the spatial arrangement of the stimuli. In one example of visual and tactile relationship, the visual stimulation in the ipsilesional side exacerbates contralesional tactile extinction, whereby the presentation of visual and tactile stimuli on the same contralesional side can reduce the deficit. Tactile and visual informations can also be integrated in other peripersonal space regions, such as around the face.

Another similar modulation interaction is between audition and touch. The contralesional tactile detection is hampered by sounds in tactile extinction patients. However, a multisensory effect observed in the front space with respect to the patients’ head was even stronger when cross-modal auditory-tactile extinction was assessed in the patients’ back space. Different degrees of multisensory integration may occur depending upon the functional relevance of a given modality. Altogether, the interactions of cross-modal seems to be a rather frequent occurrence. The results of these studies underline the relevance of cross-modal integration in enhancing visual processing in neglect patients and in patients with visual field deficits.

References 

Neurology